An electoral college is a set of electors who choose among candidates for a particular office.

Electoral College or electoral college may also refer to:

 Electoral College (United States), presidential electors
 Electoral College (India), presidential electors
 Electoral College (Pakistan), presidential electors
 Electoral College (Holy Roman Empire), prince-electors of the Holy Roman Empire 
 Electoral College (Confederate States), presidential electors
 Presidential Electoral College of Burma
 European Parliament constituencies in Belgium:
 Dutch-speaking electoral college
 French-speaking electoral college
 German-speaking electoral college

See also 
 College of Cardinals, body of all cardinals of the Roman Catholic Church, papal electors
 Election Committee (disambiguation)
 Federal Convention (Germany), body that elects the President of Germany